Prosphyracephala is a genus of flies in the family Diopsidae. The genus is presumed to be extinct, and is known from specimens in Baltic amber. Among extant taxa, Prosphyracephala most closely resembles the genus Sphyracephala. It was originally described as a species of the latter genus, but was recognized as distinct by Willi Hennig in 1965.

References

Diopsidae
†
Prehistoric Diptera genera